Eeran Sandhya is a 1985 Indian Malayalam-language film, directed by  Jeassy and produced by Rajan Joseph. The film stars Mammootty, Shobana, Rahman and Jose Prakash.

Plot

Cast 

Mammootty as Madhavankutty
Shobana as Prabha
Rahman as Raju
Jose Prakash as Krishna Menon
Ahalya as Reetha Abraham
Santhosh as Freddy Louis
Adoor Bhasi as Poulose
Sankaradi as Gopalan
Sukumari as Seetha
K. P. A. C. Sunny as Police Officer
T. P. Madhavan as Avarachan
N. F. Varghese as Police Inspector
Ashokan as Ashok
Baby Chaithanya
Thilakan
Shubha as Sumathi
Balan Parakkal

Soundtrack 
The music was composed by V. S. Narasimhan and the lyrics were written by O. N. V. Kurup.

References

External links 
 

1980s Malayalam-language films
1985 films
Films directed by Jeassy
Films scored by V. S. Narasimhan